Remember is a 1926 American silent drama film directed by David Selman and written by J. Grubb Alexander from a story by Dorothy Howell. It stars Dorothy Phillips, Earl Metcalfe, and Lola Todd. It was released on December 20, 1926.

Cast list
 Dorothy Phillips as Ruth Pomeroy
 Earl Metcalfe as Jimmy Cardigan
 Lola Todd as Constance Pomeroy
 Lincoln Stedman as Slim Dugan
 Eddie Fetherstone as Billy (credited as Eddie Featherstone)

References

External links

1926 romantic drama films
American romantic drama films
Columbia Pictures films
Films directed by David Selman
American silent feature films
American black-and-white films
1926 films
1920s English-language films
1920s American films
Silent romantic drama films
Silent American drama films